Transmembrane protein 43 (also called luma) is a protein that in humans is encoded by the TMEM43 gene. TMEM43 may have an important role in maintaining nuclear envelope structure by organizing protein complexes at the inner nuclear membrane. Required for retaining emerin at the inner nuclear membrane. However, the localization of TMEM43 in myocardial tissue is controversial discussed. Franke et al. demonstrated that TMEM43 is localized at the intercalated disc but not at the nuclear envelope. In contrast Christensen et al. have shown that TMEM43 is mainly localized at the sarcolemma. Mutations in TMEM43 are associated with  ARVD and EDMD7.

References

Further reading

External links
  GeneReviews/NCBI/NIH/UW entry on Arrhythmogenic Right Ventricular Dysplasia/Cardiomyopathy, Autosomal Dominant
  OMIM entries on Arrhythmogenic Right Ventricular Dysplasia/Cardiomyopathy, Autosomal Dominant